The Russell Education Trust (RET) is a Multi-Academy Trust. It provides educational support services in the creation and operation of free schools. It is a not-for-profit company limited by guarantee, with exempt charity status, regulated by the Department for Education. Its board members include experienced educationalists and representatives from RET schools' local governing bodies.

RET was established in 2010 by directors of the school improvement company Education London (EL) which, between 2003 and 2017, provided educational support services to Government, notably as a service provider to the London Challenge, as well as to individual Local Authorities and schools.  EL ceased trading in 2017 due to the retirement of its Operations Director, but continues to sponsor RET.

Both organisations are based in the same office building in Leatherhead, Surrey.

The Russell Education Trust has worked in partnership with  parents, communities, and diocesan authorities to establish the following free schools:

Bristol Free School, established 2011 
Becket Keys Church of England School, established 2012 
King's School, Hove, established 2013 
St Andrew the Apostle Greek Orthodox School, established 2013
Turing House School, established 2015

Governance Model
RET established its first two free schools using the Single Academy Trust model.   It formed two sub-trusts, the Bristol Free School Trust and the Becket Keys CofE Free School Trust, which each signed free school funding agreements with the Secretary of State.  Like RET itself, RET's sub-trusts are exempt charities, regulated by the Department for Education.

For its later schools RET used the Multi-Academy Trust model.

The Trust delegates a range of its governance responsibilities to each of its schools' local governing bodies via a formal Scheme of Delegation.

References

External links

Companies based in Surrey
Educational organisations based in the United Kingdom
Founders of English schools and colleges